Laura Granville and Abigail Spears were the defending champions, but had different outcomes. While Granville did not compete this year, Spears partnered with Carly Gullickson and lost in first round to Chan Chin-wei and Tetiana Luzhanska.

Maria Elena Camerin and Gisela Dulko won the title, defeating Marta Domachowska and Sania Mirza 6–4, 3–6, 6–2 in the final. It was the 3rd and final title for Camerin and the 6th title for Dulko, in their respective careers.

Seeds

Draw

External links
 Main draw

2006 WTA Tour